Elfinwild is an unincorporated village in Allegheny County, Pennsylvania, United States. It is part of Shaler Township, within the Glenshaw census-designated place. Pine Creek flows through the community.

Unincorporated communities in Allegheny County, Pennsylvania
Unincorporated communities in Pennsylvania